Jenna Lauren Andrews (born 1985 or 1986) is a Canadian singer, songwriter and record producer from Calgary, Alberta, Canada. Andrews released her debut single "Tumblin' Down" in 2010, which was featured on the television show, Grey's Anatomy and charted on the Billboard Adult R&B Songs chart. She has collaborated with artists such as BTS, Drake, Jennifer Lopez, Jessie J, Tori Kelly, Lily Allen, and Little Mix, while also being involved as an A&R consultant for Barry Weiss' label Records as well as establishing TwentySeven Music Publishing with him.

Early life
Jenna Lauren Andrews was born in Calgary, Alberta, Canada. Her mother was an elementary school teacher and her father was a professor at the University of Calgary. She aspired to become a musician at a young age after listening to Mariah Carey and Billie Holiday. Her early musical influences were inspired by her mother's love of R&B and soul music, as Andrews learned how to play the piano at the age of 5 despite not coming from a musical family. She wrote her first song at the age of 14 titled "What Am I Gonna Do", and interned at media companies such as Lite 96 FM and CTV. While attending Dr. E.P. Scarlett High School, Andrews studied music and dance, where she also co-hosted pep rallies with eventual singer Jocelyn Alice. She eventually went to Mount Royal University to study broadcast journalism, eventually deciding to move to Vancouver after six months in order to focus on becoming a full-time musician.

Career

2010–2013: Solo career
Andrews was discovered by Chris Smith, the manager of Nelly Furtado and Alessia Cara, after hearing her song "Adore" on MySpace in 2005. She wrote the song for her parents after having no money to buy Christmas presents seven months after moving to Vancouver. In 2008, Andrews was offered a production deal with Island Def Jam when Smith introduced her to American producer L.A. Reid. She released her debut single "Tumblin' Down" in 2010, which was featured on the sixth season of American medical drama television series Grey's Anatomy. On 22 October 2012, Andrews released an extended play titled Kiss and Run. She also released another EP exclusively on Rap-Up titled SexTape on 9 May 2013, which contained covers of songs including Usher's "Climax" (2012), The-Dream's "Rockin' That Shit" (2008), and Jeremih's "Birthday Sex" (2009).

2014–present: Transition to songwriting and production
After the release of SexTape, Andrews decided to focus on becoming a full-time songwriter, admitting that she was stuck in purgatory artistically and professionally. She worked together with Canadian R&B duo Majid Jordan on their 2014 debut EP A Place Like This as her first project. Andrews first encountered then 14 year old Lennon Stella on the set of 2012 television series Nashville, where she found her passion for developing young artists. In early 2016, Andrews announced that she had signed as a songwriter for Sony/ATV Music Publishing. In February 2018, Andrews joined former Island Def Jam president Barry Weiss' record label Records as an exclusive A&R consultant, signing Stella as an artist for the label and being persuaded by Weiss to add Noah Cyrus. She continued to develop other artists such as Zhavia Ward and Lauren Jauregui, while continuing to write and produce songs for Drake, Jennifer Lopez, Jessie J, Tori Kelly, and Lily Allen.

On 4 April 2019, Andrews and Weiss announced TwentySeven Music Publishing, which was a joint venture between the two. Two of the earliest members to join were Jade Thirlwall and Leigh-Anne Pinnock, both members of Little Mix, as they signed a worldwide publishing deal with Sony/ATV. Andrews offered them a deal to join after she found out that they never had a publishing deal during vocal production of "Motivate" from their fifth album LM5 (2018). She also began working with New Zealand singer Stella Rose Bennett, known as Benee, writing "Supalonely" in 2019. Andrews vocal produced the Grammy-nominated South Korean boy band BTS song "Dynamite", which was released on 21 August 2020. She worked on the band members' vocal production in three weeks, which were remotely recorded from South Korea. Andrews also vocally produced the BTS remix of the 2020 Jason Derulo and Jawsh 685 song "Savage Love (Laxed – Siren Beat)", and co-wrote and vocally produced the 2021 BTS song "Butter". In 2021, Andrews co-wrote the David Guetta, Galantis and Little Mix song "Heartbreak Anthem". She assisted in the production of Dixie's debut studio album A Letter to Me (2022), as a songwriter and executive producer.

Musical style and influences
Andrews has been described as a pop, R&B, and folk artist. She has been influenced by a range of artists including Donny Hathaway, Billie Holiday, Aaliyah, Massive Attack, Portishead, Carly Simon, and Carole King.

Other ventures
During the COVID-19 pandemic in 2020, Andrews began hosting a web series titled The Green Room, which appears on Dash Radio and is produced in partnership with The Jed Foundation and She Is The Music. The series features artists and songwriters who discuss topics such as mental health and music. Andrews initially conceived the idea in 2019, after experiencing anxiety, bullying, and an eating disorder in her childhood.

Discography

Extended plays

Singles

Featured appearances

Songwriting and production credits

References

Canadian women pop singers
Canadian women singer-songwriters
Canadian women record producers
Island Records artists
Living people
Musicians from Calgary
21st-century Canadian women singers
21st-century Canadian singers
Year of birth missing (living people)